Büri ( -, d.1252) was a son of Mutukan and a grandson of Chagatai Khan.

Life

Under Ögedei 
According to Rashid-al-Din Hamadani, Büri's mother was a wife of Chagatai Khan's slave. She was a beauty and Mutukan was attracted by her while she served in the Khan's ger. Mutukan made her pregnant and instead of marrying her, he took her baby, Büri. He was raised by Chagatai after Mutukan's death on siege of Bamiyan. He was characterized as a stubborn and brave person, especially when drunk. 

At the kurultai in Mongolia after the end of the Mongol-Jin War, the Great Khan Ögedei ordered Batu to conquer western nations. In 1235 Batu, who earlier had directed the conquest of the Crimean Peninsula, was assigned an army of possibly 130,000 to oversee an invasion of Europe. His relatives and cousins Güyük, Büri, Möngke, Khulgen, Khadan, Baidar and notable Mongol generals Subutai , Borolday, and Mengguser joined him by the order of his uncle Ögedei. The army, actually commanded by Subutai, crossed the Volga and invaded Volga Bulgaria in 1236. Büri later joined campaign of the winter of 1237-1238 - in the first invasion against Russia. On the way back from the Novgorod land to the steppe, the contingents of Kadan and Buri moved east of the main forces, including passing through the Ryazan land a second time during the campaign. At the very beginning of May 1238, the Mongol army approached Kozelsk, which was besieged for the seventh week by the main forces and taken in 3 days. 

In the winter of 1239-1240, Buri, along with Möngke, Güyük and Kadan, participated in the 3-month siege of the city of Maghas, which ended in total destruction of the city. However Büri, Güyük and Harqasun (son of Eljigidei) soon began to make fun of Batu and insulted him. Both Güyük and Buri were recalled by Great Khan Ögedei, and Buri was sent to his grandfather Chagatai. After a year in Mongolia, he was returned to Batu to participate in the invasion of Europe. 

When the Mongols advanced into Central Europe, he ravaged Wallachia. He invaded Burzenland on 31 March 1241, crushing the armies of Pousa, the Voivode of Transylvania. Further entering the territory of Kingdom of Hungary, Büri captured the town of Kumelburch 5 days later.

Under Töregene, Güyük and Möngke 
He went back to Central Asia after Ögedei's death. He brought enslaved German miners and Teutonic Knights put to work in his appanage around Talas. He was present at Güyük's coronation ceremony on 24 August 1246, representing Chagatai Ulus together with Qara Hülegü, Yesü Möngke, Baidar and Yesünto'a. After Güyük's death in 1248, he sided with regent Oghul Qaimish khatun. However, he didn't attend the election ceremony of new khagan Möngke. He was captured and sent to Batu by Möngke, who executed him in 1252.

Family 
Wives and concubines of Büri aren't known. Name of his children also subject to debate. For example, his eldest son Qadaqai Setsen (died during second stage of Mongol conquest of Song China - 1251–60) is sometimes shows as Chagatai's own son. This list follows Boyle's version.

 Abishqa (d. 1252)
 Azhiji (d. around 1306) — Commander of Gansu and Hexi under Kublai and Temür Khan, Prince of Weiyuan (威远王)
 Örüg
 Örüg Temür
 Chin Temür
 Ershil
 Princess Huihe (回鹘公主) — married to Öngüt prince Qiu Lincha (丘邻察)
 Qadaqai Setsen
 Taliqu — khan (1308-1309)
 Temür
 Oradai
 Tümen
 Bughu
 Dhul Qarnain
 Ali
 Buqa Temür — khan (1272–1282)
 Örüg Temür
 Öljei
 Buqa
 Ahmad (d. 1270) — killed by Baraq's emir Na'uldar
 Baba (d. 1317)
 Habil Temür
 Qabil Temür
 Yulduz Temür
 Sati
 Töre (d. 1309) — Prince of Yue (越王)
 Aratnashiri (c. 1331)
 Darma (c. 1343)

References

Sources

Bibliography

1252 deaths
13th-century Mongolian people
Chagatai khans
Year of birth unknown